Ben Long may refer to:
Ben Long (American painter) (born 1945)
Ben Long (British artist) (born 1978), English contemporary visual artist
Ben Long (footballer) (born 1997), Australian rules footballer playing for the St Kilda Football Club
Benjamin Long (1838–1877), Swiss-born mayor of Dallas in 1868–1870 and 1872–1874

See also
Benjamin Longue (born 1980), New Caledonian footballer
Ben Leong (born 1986), Malaysian professional golfer